The Potou Lagoon is a shallow body of water primarily located near the Aguien Lagoon in the southeastern corner of the republic of Ivory Coast.

References

Lagoons of Ivory Coast
Sud-Comoé